Coco & Breezy is a sunglasses company based in the United States. The company was founded in 2009 by Corianna ("Coco") and Brianna ("Breezy") Dotson, African American and Puerto Rican identical twin sisters, when the sisters were 19 years old.  Their pieces have been worn by such celebrities, as Prince, Kelly Osbourne, Lady Gaga, Nicki Minaj and Serena Williams.  In April 2012, Adidas announced they will be enlisting the design help of the sisters in their "Originals White Space Project."

References

External links
Official Website
Designer Sunglasses
Coco & Breezy Dotson Interview on Fox Twin Cities

Sunglasses
Eyewear brands of the United States
Eyewear companies of the United States